Mala Bosna may refer to:

 Mala Bosna, Serbia, a village near Subotica
 Mala Bosna, Croatia, a neighborhood of Vinkovci